The 1899 Central Michigan Normalites football team represented Central Michigan Normal School, later renamed Central Michigan University, as an independent during the 1899 college football season.  Under head coach Carl Pray, the Normalites compiled a 3–2 record, and outscored their opponents by a total of 35 to 22.

Schedule

References

Central Michigan
Central Michigan Chippewas football seasons
Central Michigan Normalites football